Eric Joseph Stout (born March 27, 1993) is an American professional baseball pitcher in the Chicago Cubs organization. He has previously played in MLB for the Kansas City Royals, Chicago Cubs and Pittsburgh Pirates.

Career

Kansas City Royals
Stout was drafted by the Kansas City Royals in the 13th round of the 2014 MLB Draft out of Butler University. He signed and was assigned to the Idaho Falls Chukars, where he spent all of his first professional season, going 5–2 with a 3.58 ERA in 32.2 innings pitched. In 2015, Stout played for the AZL Royals, Lexington Legends, Northwest Arkansas Naturals, and Idaho Falls, posting a combined 0–1 record and 3.15 ERA in 20 games between the four teams. He spent 2016 with Northwest Arkansas, going 6–4 with a 3.86 ERA in 42 games, and 2017 with the Omaha Storm Chasers, pitching to a 5–2 record and 2.99 ERA in 45 games. The Royals added him to their 40-man roster after the 2017 season.

Stout began 2018 back with Omaha. He was called up to the Major Leagues on April 24, 2018. He is the only MLB player to be born in Glen Ellyn, Illinois Stout was designated for assignment on September 5, and later released on September 10.

San Diego Padres
On January 4, 2019, Stout signed a minor league contract with the San Diego Padres. He was released on March 27, 2019.

Kansas City T-Bones
On April 1, 2019, Stout signed with the Kansas City T-Bones of the independent American Association.

Cincinnati Reds
On May 31, 2019, Stout's contract was purchased by the Cincinnati Reds. He became a free agent following the 2019 season.

Chicago Dogs
On March 4, 2020, Stout re-signed with the Kansas City T-Bones of the American Association of Independent Professional Baseball. The T-Bones were not selected to compete in the condensed 60-game season due to the COVID-19 pandemic. However, he was later drafted by the Chicago Dogs in the 2020 dispersal draft. Stout was released on July 31, 2020.

Kansas City Monarchs
On January 20, 2021, Stout signed with the Kansas City Monarchs of the American Association of Professional Baseball. Stout recorded a 2-1 record and 1.96 ERA across 4 appearances for Kansas City.

Miami Marlins
On June 6, 2021, Stout’s contract was purchased by the Miami Marlins organization. He was assigned to the Triple-A Jacksonville Jumbo Shrimp. In 7 appearances for Jacksonville, Stout was 0-2 with a 10.19 ERA and 21 strikeouts. On August 12, Stout was released by the Marlins.

Kansas City Monarchs (second stint)
On August 27, 2021, Stout re-signed with the Kansas City Monarchs of the American Association of Professional Baseball.

Chicago Cubs
On March 8, 2022, prior to the start of the American Association season, Stout's contract was purchased by the Chicago Cubs organization. Chicago selected Stout's contract on June 13, and designated him for assignment on June 16.

Pittsburgh Pirates
On June 16, 2022, Stout was claimed off waivers by the Pittsburgh Pirates. He elected free agency on November 10, 2022.

Chicago Cubs (second stint)
On December 15, 2022, Stout signed a minor league contract with the Cubs.

References

External links

1993 births
Living people
People from Glen Ellyn, Illinois
Baseball players from Illinois
Major League Baseball pitchers
Kansas City Royals players
Chicago Cubs players
Pittsburgh Pirates players
Butler Bulldogs baseball players
Idaho Falls Chukars players
Arizona League Royals players
Lexington Legends players
Northwest Arkansas Naturals players
Surprise Saguaros players
Omaha Storm Chasers players
Kansas City T-Bones players
Chattanooga Lookouts players
Louisville Bats players
Indios de Mayagüez players
Chicago Dogs players
Jacksonville Jumbo Shrimp players
Iowa Cubs players
Waterloo Bucks players